Microphisa Boisduval, 1840 is a synonym of either of two genera of moths in the family Erebidae and subfamily Boletobiinae:

Odice Hübner, [1823]
Eublemma Hübner, 1829